The Doane College Osterhout Arboretum is an arboretum at Doane College, Crete, Nebraska, named in honour of M. David Osterhout.

The Doane College Arboretum was officially rededicated as Osterhout Arboretum on May 9, 2002. The arboretum honors M. David Osterhout, a 1937 Doane graduate and a longtime college employee who served the college in many capacities, including acting president, treasurer, and senior vice president. Osterhout was also a leader in campus landscaping and plant preservation throughout his tenure at the college.

The  Osterhout Arboretum includes special gardens; several distinctive, historical tree groves; lakes; an outdoor amphitheater; fountains; and wooded nature trails.
Doane College has been a partner in the Nebraska Statewide Arboretum since 1979. This network of horticulture sites was established to promote knowledge, appreciation, and conservation of trees and other plants throughout the state.

External links
 Khouri to Receive Arboretum Honor, Doane College official website (2006-11-01) Retrieved on (2007-12-30).

Arboreta in Nebraska
Botanical gardens in Nebraska
Doane University
Protected areas of Saline County, Nebraska